Erechthias dissimulans is a moth of the family Tineidae first described by Edward Meyrick in 1915. It is found in Sri Lanka.

References

Moths of Asia
Moths described in 1915
Erechthiinae